The  ( or), sometimes spelled epee in English, is the largest and heaviest of the three weapons used in the sport of fencing. The modern  derives from the 19th-century , a weapon which itself derives from the French small sword.

It has a stiffer blade than a foil. It is triangular in cross-section with a V-shaped groove called a fuller. The  also has a larger bell guard designed to protect the user’s arm. In addition to the larger “bell” guard and blade, the  weighs more than the foil and sabre which contributes to its reputation of being the slowest form of fencing. The techniques of use differ, as there are no rules regarding priority and right of way. Thus, immediate counterattacks are a common feature of  fencing. The entire body is a valid target area.

Background

The  is the heaviest of the three modern fencing weapons. As with all fencing disciplines, fencing matches with the  require concentration, accuracy, and speed. Since the entire body is a target, a successful  fencer must be able to anticipate the opponent's moves and strike the opponent at the correct time.

In most higher-level competitions, an electrically grounded (earthed) piste is used to prevent floor hits from registering as touches. In  fencing, unlike in the other two disciplines, there are no right-of-way rules regarding attacks, other than the aforementioned rule regarding touches with only the point of the weapon. Touches are awarded solely on the basis of which fencer makes a touch first, according to the electronic scoring machines.

A special aspect of the  discipline is the counterattack, a tactic employed in response to an attack.  Some specifications include two varieties, the stop-thrust and the time thrust, which are (respectively) a simple counterattack and a counterattack on the opposition. With the absence of right-of-way, following an attack and landing a counterattack correctly can be a highly efficient way to score a touch, hence the counterattack's ubiquity in  fencing.

Description

A modern , of size 5, for use by adult fencers has a blade that measures  from the guard to the tip.

Wires may run down a groove in  blades fitted for electric scoring, with a depressible button capping the point.

The guard has numerous forms, but all are essentially a hemispherical shield, the section of which fits in a  cylinder. This is frequently called a bell guard.

As with a foil, the grip of an  can be exchanged for another if it has a screw-on pommel. Grip options primarily include the French grip and the pistol grip.

The tip is wired to a connector in the guard, then to an electronic scoring device or "box".

In the groove formed by the V-shaped blade, there are two thin wires leading from the far end of the blade to a connector in the guard. These wires are held in place with a strong glue. The amount of glue is kept to a minimum as in the unlikely (but possible) case that a fencer manages a touch in that glue, the touch would be registered on the electrical equipment, as the glue is not conductive (the blade is grounded). In the event of tip to tip hits, a point should not be awarded. A "body cord" with a three-pronged plug at each end is placed underneath the fencer's clothing and attached to the connector in the guard, then to a wire leading to the scoring box. The scoring box signals with lights (one for each fencer) and a tone each time the tip is depressed.

The tip of an electric , called the "button", comprises several parts: the mushroom-shaped, movable  ('point of arrest') at the end; its housing or "barrel" which is threaded onto the blade; a contact spring; and a return spring. The tips are generally held in place by two small grub screws, which thread into the sides of the tip through elongated openings on either side of the barrel. The screws hold the tip within the barrel but are allowed to travel freely in the openings. While this is the most common system, screwless variations do exist. The return spring must allow the tip to support a force of  without registering a touch. The contact spring is threaded in or out of the tip to adjust for this distance. These specifications are tested at the start of each bout during competitions. During competitions, fencers are required to have a minimum of two weapons and two body wires in case of failure or breakage.

Bouts with the different fencing weapons have a different tempo; as with foil fencing, the tempo for an  bout is rather slow with sudden bursts of speed, but these are more common in  due to counterattacks.

History

Dueling sword

The French word  ultimately derives from Latin . The term was introduced into English in the 1880s for the sportive fencing weapon.

Like the foil, the  evolved from light civilian weapons such as the small sword, which, since the late 17th century, had been the most commonly used dueling sword, replacing the rapier.

The dueling sword developed in the 19th century when, under pressure from the authorities, duels were more frequently fought until "first blood" only, instead of to the death. Under this provision, it became sufficient to inflict a minor nick on the wrist or other exposed area on the opponent in order to win the duel. This resulted in emphasis on light touches to the arm and hand, while downplaying hits to the torso (chest, back, groin). Rapiers with full-cup guards had been made since the mid 17th century, but were not widespread before the 19th century.

Sport
Today,  fencing somewhat resembles 19th-century dueling. An  fencer must hit the target with the tip of the weapon.

The spikes caused  fencing to be a notoriously painful affair, and  fencers could be easily recognized by the tears in their jacket sleeves. A later evolution of the sport used a point that was dipped in a dye, which showed the location of touches on a white uniform; the dye was soluble in weak acid (e.g., acetic acid) to remove old marks. Today, competition is done with electric weapons, where a circuit is closed when the touch is made. Non-electric weapons are now typically used only for practice, generally fitted with plastic buttons or solid "dummy points".

Modern  fencing underwent a paradigm shift from classical fencing in the 1970s and 1980s. The shift was pioneered by Eric Sollee, fencing coach at MIT, and his student, Johan Harmenberg, who subsequently won the World Fencing Championships and the Olympic gold medal. This new strategic approach is based on the "Sollee conjectures" or the "three conjectures":

 Is it possible for the fencer with the lower technical ability to decide the technical level at which a bout will be fought?
 Can the fencer with the shorter fencing distance control the distance in a bout?
 Is it possible to force one's opponent into your one's own area of greatest strength?

This new training system (which answered those questions with yes) resulted in Harmenberg closing the fencing distance, using absence of blade with destructive parries to prevent opponents using their own strongest moves, and pushing them into attacking high which was a prerequisite for Harmenberg using his own strongest move. Harmenberg used this approach to win eight individual and team gold medals at Olympics, World Fencing Championships, and Fencing World Cup competitions. As a result, many if not most of the top fencers have used the new paradigm or at least adjusted to fence against those who do.

See also

References

External links

 Épée introduction and strategy basics

Fencing
Modern European swords

pt:Esgrima#Espada
ro:Spadă